Grelton is an unincorporated community on the borders of Monroe and Richfield Townships in Henry County, Ohio, United States.  It has a post office with the ZIP code 43523.  It is located on County Road 7 approximately two miles south of U.S. Route 6.

References

Unincorporated communities in Ohio
Unincorporated communities in Henry County, Ohio